This article contains a list of notable Malay Singaporeans, people with Malay ancestry born or naturalised in Singapore.

Note: For Malays in Singapore, the last name is patronymic, not a family name. The person should be referred to by his or her first or second name which is the given name. The Malay word bin (b.) or binte (bte.), if used, means "son of" or "daughter of" respectively.

Academia

Ahmad Mohamed Ibrahim (1916–1999): law professor; studied at St. John's College, Cambridge; won Municipal Commission Election as an independent; first Attorney-General of Singapore; Singapore's ambassador to Egypt; Professor of Legal Studies, University of Malaya (1969–1972); Dean of Faculty of Law, University of Malaya (1972–1983); Shaikh and the Dean of the Kulliyyah of Laws, University of Malaysia (1983–1999).
Hadijah Rahmat: Associate Professor, PhD in Malay-Indonesian Studies from University of London; Deputy Head of Asian Languages and Culture at Nanyang Technological University; author or editor of over 40 books and chapters, numerous academic papers, two poetry books, and two children's books; specializes in Malay and Singapore Malay literature, Malay settlements and socio-cultural developments in Singapore.
Hussin Mutalib: Associate Professor; PhD from University of Sydney, Australia; Department of Political Science at the National University of Singapore (1980s– ); author of six books and multiple academic papers on Islam and Muslims in Southeast Asia.
Lily Zubaidah Rahim: Associate Professor of Politics at the University of Sydney, Australia; lectures on Southeast Asian Politics and Political Islam; written and edited multiple books and chapters including The Singapore Dilemma: The Political and Educational Marginality of the Malay Community (2001) and Singapore in the Malay World: Building and Breaching Regional Bridges (2009); daughter of Abdul Rahim Ishak, Senior Minister of State (Foreign Affairs), and niece of Singapore's first president, Yusof Ishak.

Arts and entertainment

Aaron Mustapha bin Aziz (1976– ): TV and film actor better known as Aaron Aziz; his 2011 film, KL Gangster, was the highest grossing in Malaysian box office history until 2014.
Abdul Wahid Bin Ahmad or Wahid Satay (1930– ): singer, comedian and actor; appeared in many Malay films of the 1950s to 1960s; known by the moniker "Satay" after his role as a satay seller in the Malay horror movie Pontianak (1957); awarded the Perdana Golden Award (2007).
 (1919–2009): composer and musician; composed many songs for Malay films; conductor of the Radio & Television of Singapore (1967–1984); awarded Public Service Medal (1970), Cultural Medallion (1982), Composers and Authors Society of Singapore (COMPASS) Artistic Excellence Award (1998), and COMPASS Lifetime Achievement Award (2005).
 Bani Buang (1930–1996): regarded as the "father of modern Malay drama"; produced and directed the 1970s Malay TV series Sandiwara; headed the Malay Drama Unit of the Singapore Broadcasting Corporation; awarded the Cultural Medallion in its first year (1979).
Hanis Saini Hussey (1964– ): fashion model; crowned 'Catwalk Model of the Year Singapore' (1982); first Asian to close the Yves Saint Laurent fall-winter show (1983); modeled for Balmain, Givenchy, Ungaro, Lanvin, Dior and Jean-Louis Scherrer; first Singapore model to appear on the cover of Time Magazine Asia.
Hazlina Abdul Halim (1985– ): television presenter, journalist and radio announcer; presenter on Mediacorp Suria's news program, Berita.
Iskandar Ismail (1956–2014): composer, conductor, musical director and record producer; arranged for the Shanghai Philharmonic Orchestra, Singapore Symphony Orchestra, Istana Budaya Orchestra of Malaysia, China National Opera & Ballet Orchestra, Singapore National Day Parade, and Chingay Parade; produced for Cantopop kings Jacky Cheung and Aaron Kwok and Hong Kong singer Sandy Lam; awarded the Cultural Medallion (2008).
Iskandar Jalil (1940– ): ceramist who integrates Japanese and Islamic styles; his works owned by the National Museum of Sweden, Sultan of Brunei, former American President George H Bush, and the former Governor of Hong Kong.
Ithnaini binte Mohd Taib or Anita Sarawak (1952– ): singer, host and actress who appeared in several Malay films in the 1960s; performed at Caesar's Palace in the 1980s; inducted into the Singapore Women's Hall of Fame (2017); daughter of actress Siput Sarawak.
 or Momo Latiff (1921– 2015): singer, comedienne and actress in many Malay films (1930s–1970s); awarded the Johan Pingat Sarawak medal (2007).
 Mohd Najip Bin Ali or Najip Ali: TV personality; host of the star-search TV programme Asia Bagus (1990s); fired for a comment he made about Malaysian Prime Minister Najib Razak (2017).
Muhammad (Idris) Nuridris or stagename: "A-trez" or "A'trez"  (1986 - ) : Rapper, hip hop songwriter based in Malaysia who written and collaborated with Altimet, Noorhaqmal Mohamed Noor (Aqmal N), Ryan Deedat and Erwin Dawson.
Muhammad Mirzahady Bin Amir or Hady Mirza (1980 – ): singer; winner of the reality TV competition Singapore Idol (2006) and the first Asian Idol (2007).
Muhammad Taufik Bin Batisah or Taufik Batisah (1981– ): singer, songwriter and producer; winner of the first reality TV competition Singapore Idol (2004); released five albums between 2007 and 2014.
Nuraliza Osman (1977– ): winner of Miss Singapore Universe (2002); lawyer with Rajah & Tann; legal counsel with Shell Eastern Petroleum (2005).
Noorhaqmal Mohamed Noor or Aqmal N. (1984 – ): singer and songwriter; winner of multiple awards from Mediacorp.
 (1932–1971): actor who was a protege of P. Ramlee and appeared in 49 films in his 15-year career; especially remembered for his roles as a tragic hero in Air Mata Duyong (A Mermaid's Tears), Dang Anum, Raden Mas and Hang Jebat.
 Norleena Salim (1973– ): popular TV actress, comedian and singer; known for her role as Rosnah in Mediacorp's sitcom Under One Roof.
 or Siput Sarawak (1921–1999): acted in about 50 films in the 1950s and 1960s; best known for playing the "bad girl" and evil characters; won the Veteran Artist Award at the 9th Malaysian Film Festival (1991); mother of Anita Sarawak.
Ramli Sarip (1952– ): singer and recording artist; known as "Papa Rock" and as one of the founders of the Singapore rock scene; seven albums with his group Sweet Charity (late 1970s–1980s); eight solo albums (as of 2011); awarded the COMPASS Artistic Excellence Award (1998).
Salmah binti Ismail or Saloma (1935–1983): singer, actress, and fashion icon; acted in many films including Azimat, Seniman Bujang Lapok, and Ahmad Albab.
Sezairi Sezali (1987– ): singer, winner of the reality TV series competition Singapore Idol (Third Season, 2009).
Shamsuddin bin Dali or S. Shamsuddin (1928–2013): actor and comedian; acted in over 30 movies (1950s and 1960s) including Nujum Pak Belalang (Mr. Grasshopper the Astrologer, 1959), Nasib Si Labu Labi (Labu's and Labi's Luck, 1963) and Tiga Abdul (The Three Abduls, 1964).
 (1905–1997): actor; known as "Father of Bangsawan" because of his background in bangsawan (Malay Opera); in the first Malay talkie film Laila Majnun and a number of other Malay films in the 1950s and 1960s; in the regular cast of the Malay TV series Sandiwara (1970s).
 Som Binte Mohamed Said (1951– ): dancer, instructor and choreographer of Malay dance; holds a degree in Dance Anthropology (Sarjana Seni - IKJ, Indonesia); dancer with Singapore's National Dance Company; formed the Sriwana Children's Dance section; presented with the National Youth Service award (1979), the Cultural Medallion (1987), and the Public Service Medal (1992).
Suhaimi Yusof: actor & comedian; acted in sitcoms such as Police & Thief and The Noose.
Wandly Yazid (1925–2005): composer and arranger of Malay film music in the 1940s to 1960s; member of Singapore Symphony Orchestra and Singapore Broadcasting Corporation
 (1922–1998): actor who appeared in a number of Malay films in the 1950s and 1960s, the weekly Malay TV series Sandiwara (1970s), and on Radio & Television of Singapore Channel 5.
Zaiton Abdullah: actress; has acted in films such as Bujang Lapok , Anak-ku Sazali and Ibu Mertuaku.
Zubir Said (1907–1987): musician and composer; worked for Cathay-Keris Film Productions for 12 years; composed the Singapore National Anthem Majulah Singapura; awarded the Sijil Kemuliaan (Certificate of Honour, 1963), the Public Service Star (1963), the Cultural Medallion (1971), and a Lifetime Achievement Award by COMPASS (1995).

Criminals

Mohammed Ali bin Johari (1976–2008): drug addict and convicted murderer; he gained notoriety for the 2006 high-profile child rape and murder of his stepdaughter Nurasyura binte Mohamed Fauzi, better known as Nonoi in the media. He was found guilty of murder and sentenced to death on 31 August 2007. A year later, Mohammed Ali was executed by hanging on 19 December 2008.
Iskandar bin Rahmat (3 February 1979–): former police officer and convicted murderer; he was sentenced to death for murdering two people during an armed robbery in 2013, for which the case was dubbed the "Kovan Double Murders" in media. He remains on death row as of May 2021.
Abdul Nasir bin Amer Hamsah (1969–): convicted robber and kidnapper; he was notable for causing the death of a Japanese tourist during a robbery in a hotel in 1994 and kidnapping two police officers in 1996. Abdul Nasir was convicted of robbery with hurt and kidnapping in two separate trials and received a total of 38 years' imprisonment and 30 strokes of the cane (18 strokes for robbery and 12 strokes for kidnapping). His accomplice of the hotel robbery-murder case, Abdul Rahman bin Arshad, was incarcerated for 10 years and caned 16 strokes of the cane for robbery with hurt.
 Abdul Rahman bin Arshad (born 1961 or 1962–): convicted robber and accomplice of Abdul Nasir bin Amer Hamsah in the Oriental Hotel Murder case. He was jailed for 10 years and caned 16 strokes of the cane for robbery with hurt, in addition to a 20-month jail term for unrelated charges of theft. Released since 2006.
Norhisham bin Mohamad Dahlan (18 May 1980–): convicted killer and gang leader of secret society gang Salakau. He was known as the mastermind of a 8-member gang attack on 17-year-old national football player Sulaiman bin Hashim, who died from the fatal assault. Initially charged with murder, Norhisham was found guilty of manslaughter (culpable homicide not amounting to murder) and sentenced to 10 years' imprisonment and 16 strokes of the cane for the crime. Five of his other seven accomplices were convicted and sentenced while the remaining two remains at large till today.
 Muhamad Hasik bin Sahar (c. February 1980–), accomplice of Norhisham bin Mohamad Dahlan in the murder of Sulaiman bin Hashim, a teenage national football player. He was sentenced to life imprisonment and 16 strokes of the cane, the heaviest sentence meted out compared to the mastermind Norhisham and his four other gang members who were caught.
Taufik Zahar (c. 1981–2015): alleged drug offender and victim of a police shooting incident. He was shot by police near Shangri-La Hotel when he tried to drive away to escape the police check due to him in possession of drugs inside his car.
 Shaiful Edham Adam (1976–1999), Singaporean convicted murderer who killed a Bulgarian student in early 1998 over money issues; he used a parang to slice the throat of the student, whose name was Iordanka Apostolova, before disposing of her corpse at a canal. He was executed in July 1999 for her murder.
 Norishyam Mohamed Ali (1972–1999), a friend and accomplice of Shaiful Edham Adam, the latter who killed Iordanka Apostolova. Norishyam assisted Shaiful, whom he knew since their years in National Service, to push the cushion on Apostolova's face and held her legs down while Shaiful brought the parang down on Apostolova's neck. Although he stated in his defence that he did not kill Apostolova, and only helped Shaiful to dispose of the body with Hezlinda's help, he was nevertheless sentenced to death and executed in July 1999 for Apostolova's murder since his actions to help Shaiful restrain Apostolova were deemed as part of the common intention to kill the victim, which fitted the definition of murder under the law. 
 Hezlinda A. Rahman (born 1976), wife and accomplice of Shaiful Edham Adam, the latter who killed Iordanka Apostolova. Hezlinda assisted her husband Shaiful, with whom she had a daughter, to dispose of the victim's corpse and never reported the crime to the police. For destroying evidence of Apostolova's murder and failure to report a murder case to the authorities, Hezlinda was sentenced to be jailed for six years in January 1999; she is currently released from jail.
 Azlin Arujunah (born April 1992), convicted child abuser who was initially accused of murdering her five-year-old son through scalding. She is the wife of Ridzuan Mega Abdul Rahman. She was sentenced to 28 years in jail for her multiple physical and psychological abuse of her deceased son. However, her conviction was amended to murder as a result of the prosecution's appeal, and her sentence was increased to life imprisonment.
 Ridzuan Mega Abdul Rahman (born 1992), convicted child abuser who was initially accused of murdering his five-year-old son through scalding. He is the husband of Azlin Arujunah. He was sentenced to 27 years in jail and 24 strokes of the cane for the multiple physical and psychological abuse of his son. However, his sentence was increased to life imprisonment due to the prosecution's appeal.
 Rosli Ahmat (1970–2002), Singaporean convicted armed robber and murderer who, in 2000, killed a 42-year-old taxi driver named Koh Ngiap Yong, after he and his two accomplices robbed Koh of his taxi to use as an escape vehicle for future robbery crimes planned by the trio. Rosli, who was the one using the bayonet to inflict four fatal wounds on the taxi driver, was executed for Koh's murder in October 2002.
 Wan Kamil Mohamed Shafian (1967–2002), Singaporean convicted armed robber and murderer. He was one of the two accomplices of Rosli Ahmat, who killed 42-year-old taxi driver Koh Ngiap Yong. Wan Kamil, who masterminded the trio's planned series of armed robberies, was found to be involved in Koh's murder when he and another man was investigated for a robbery-murder of 39-year-old moneychanger Jahabar Sathick. Wan Kamil was similarly executed for Koh's murder in October 2002.
 Ibrahim Mohamed (1965–2002), Singaporean convicted armed robber and murderer. He was the third accomplice of Rosli Ahmat and Wan Kamil Mohamed Shafian. Ibrahim was also one of the two killers of 39-year-old moneychanger Jahabar Sathick, when they robbed him of his mobile phone. Like Wan Kamil, Ibrahim was found to be involved in Koh's murder when he was investigated for Sathick's murder. Ibrahim, who acted as the getaway driver in the case of Koh's murder, was similarly executed for Koh's murder in October 2002.
 Mohamed Yasin bin Hussin (born 1953; died unknown), Singaporean convicted rapist and murderer who robbed, raped and murdered Poon Sai Imm, a 58-year-old Chinese woman living on Pulau Ubin. Yasin was initially sentenced to death for murder, but he later escaped the gallows following an appeal, which reduced his sentence to two years in jail. Eventually, the court added eight more years to Yasin's revised sentence for the rape of Poon. Yasin's accomplice Harun bin Ripin, who was only involved in the robbery, was later jailed for 12 years and caned 12 strokes.
 Abdul Kahar Othman, a Singaporean drug trafficker arrested for trafficking diamorphine in 2010. He was sentenced to death five years later and lost his appeals against the sentence. Abdul Kahar was hanged on 30 March 2022 at age 68, becoming the first death row prisoner to be executed during the COVID-19 pandemic in Singapore.
 Norasharee Gous, a Singaporean drug trafficker who was the mastermind that ordered two men to traffic heroin in 2013. Norasharee was caught in 2015 after a two-year police investigation, and he denied his crime. Nevertheless, Norasharee was convicted and later hanged on 7 July 2022. 
Nazeri Lajim, a Singaporean drug trafficker who was caught smuggling diamorphine in April 2012. While his Malaysian accomplice was sentenced to caning plus life in prison, Nazeri was deemed to play a larger role behind the trafficking and hence was sentenced to death in 2017. Five years after his sentencing, Nazeri was executed on 22 July 2022 despite the appeals for clemency by his sister, activists and international organizations.
Abdul Rahim Shapiee, a Singaporean drug trafficker who was one of the three arrested for smuggling diamorphine in 2015. One of the accomplices, Nuraiin Rosman was sentenced to life imprisonment, while both Abdul Rahim and the third accomplice Ong Seow Ping were sentenced to hang on 2018. The execution of Abdul Rahim and Ong took place at Changi Prison on 5 August 2022.
Mohamed Aliff Mohamed Yusoff, a Singaporean who was charged with voluntarily causing grievous hurt to his girlfriend's infant son Izz Fayyaz Zayani Ahmad, who was nine months old at the time of his death in 2019. Aliff had caused the boy's death by slamming his head against the floorboard of his new van twice. Aliff's charge was later upgraded to murder, and he was found guilty. Aliff was sentenced to life imprisonment and fifteen strokes of the cane.
Maksa bin Tohaiee, a 18-year-old cleaner and Singaporean charged with the murder of 38-year-old Clementina Curci, an Italian housewife. Maksa, who strangled Curci before immersing her naked body in water (which caused Curci to drown and die), was found guilty of murder and sentenced to death, and eventually hanged on 26 November 1993.
Zainal Abidin Abdul Malik, a hotel employee with a criminal record of armed robbery and housebreaking offences, was charged in 1994 with the murder of 47-year-old Senior Staff Sergeant (SSSgt) Boo Tiang Huat of the Singapore Police Force, as he used an axe to strike the policeman on the head, which led to the cop dying on the spot. Zainal Abidin was found guilty and sentenced to hang for murder by the High Court, and he was eventually put to death on 30 August 1996.
Ibrahim Masod, a security guard and driver who was charged with kidnapping and killing 56-year-old goldsmith Phang Tee Wah. Ibrahim and his accomplice Liow Han Heng (also his long-time friend) were convicted and sentenced to death, but in the end, only Ibrahim was hanged on 29 July 1994 while Liow died from a heart attack while on death row.
Indra Wijaya Ibrahim, a drug abuser who killed a 80-year-old woman Loo Kwee Hwa after robbing her inside a lift in 1994. Indra was found guilty for murdering Loo and later put to death on 29 September 1995.
Mohamad Ashiek Salleh, an unemployed Singaporean who committed the robbery and murder of Teo Kim Hock on 23 December 1992. He was hanged on 16 June 1995 for the killing.
Junalis Lumat, an unemployed Singaporean and Mohamad Asheik Salleh's accomplice who had a criminal record for housebreaking. He was charged with killing two taxi drivers Seing Koo Wan and Teo Kim Hock, and was executed for the murders on 16 June 1995.
Jamaludin Ibrahim, a repairman who killed his two neighbours - 53-year-old Lau Gek Leng and 55-year-old Luke Yip Khuan - during a robbery in February 1993. Jamaludin was sentenced to death, and later hanged at Changi Prison in July 1995.

Entrepreneurs (Start-ups)

To be Updated

Library & Information Sciences

To be Updated

Literature and Culture

Alfian Sa'at (1977– ): writer, poet and playwright; published works include Corridor which received a Singapore Literature Prize Commendation Award (1998) .
 Isa Kamari (1960– ): writer, published works include seven novels, including Memeluk Gerhana (2008) and Intercession (2010), two collections of poetry, a collection of short stories, two television scripts and two plays; received the S.E.A Write Award (2006), the Cultural Medallion (2007), and the Anugerah Tun Seri Lanang, the highest Malay literary award (2009).
 Masuri Salikun or Masuri S. N. (1927–2005): poet, writer and playwright; fellow at the Institute of Southeast Asian Studies and Iowa University; resident writer of the Malaysian Language Institute and the National University of Singapore; founding member of Asas '50; recipient of the Public Service Star (2000); notable works include Awan Putih (White Cloud, 1958) and Dalam Merenung Dalam (In Deep Thought, 2006).
 Mohamed Latiff Mohamed (1950– ): writer and social activist; three-time winner of Singapore Literature Prize in 2004, 2006 and 2008 for Bagiku Sepilah Sudah (It's Quiet For Me), an anthology of poetry, Nostalgia Yang Hilang (Lost Nostalgia), a collection of short stories, and Bila Rama-Rama Patah Sayapnya (When the Butterfly Breaks Its Wing); winner of the Cultural Medallion (2013).
 Dr. Mohamed Pitchay Gani Bin Mohamed Abdul Aziz (1967– ): writer, lecturer, educator, teacher, researcher, editor and social activist;field of expertise is Malay literature and language; Lifetime president of Angkatan Sasterwan' 50 (2009– ).
 or Mohd Eunos Abdullah (1876–1934): writer and social activist; member of the Johore royal family; ran Malay language newspaper Utusan Melayu (1912–1914); first Malay member of the Straits Settlements Legislative Council (1924); first president of Singapore Malay Union, 1926.
 (1924–2016): teacher, expert and activist of Malay language and culture; founding member of Asas '50 (1950); co-wrote the lyrics for Singapore's National Anthem (1959); first winner of Tun Seri Lanang Award (1993); awarded the Cultural Medallion (1987) and Public Service Star (2000).
Muhammad Jailani Abu Talib (1985– ): writer and poet; won Golden Point Award (2nd) for short stories (2009); poems published in Reflecting On The Merlion: An Anthology of Poems (2009) and From The Window of This Epoch (2010).

Policemen
 Mirza Abdul Halim Mirza Abdul Majid, a police constable who was shot in the head by a housebreaking suspect and died in a coma 33 hours later. Abdul Halim was given the rare field promotion of Corporal for his bravery and in the aftermath, the killer Ong Yeow Tian was executed for his murder and shooting at two other officers.

Politics
Abdul Rahim Ishak (1925–2001): Minister of Education (1965–1968) and Senior Minister of Foreign Affairs (1972–1981); brother of the first President of Singapore, Yusof Ishak.
 Abdul Samad Ismail (1924–2008): journalist and leading Malay political activist in the 1950s and 60s; founding member of the People's Action Party (PAP); received the Ramon Magsaysay Award for Journalism, Literature and Creative Communications Arts in 1994. 
 Abdullah Tarmugi (1944– ): Member of Parliament (MP) for Siglap Single Member Constituency (SMC) (1984–1991), Bedok Group Representation Constituency (GRC) (1991–1996), and East Coast GRC (1996–2011); Minister for Community Development (1994–2000) and Minister-in-charge of Muslim Affairs (1996–2002); seventh Speaker of the Singapore Parliament (2002–2011); Presidential Council for Minority Rights (1994– ).
Ahmad Ibrahim (b. 1927–d. 1962): MP for the Sembawang constituency as an independent and, later, as a member of the PAP; Minister for Health (1959–1961); Minister for Labor (1961–1962).
Ahmad Mattar (1940– ): member of parliament for Leng Kee SMC (1972–1976), Minister-in-charge of Muslim Affairs (1977–1996), and Minister for the Environment (1985–1995) where he is credited with cleaning up the Singapore River; Chairman of IMC Technologies, a private educational institution.
Muhamad Faisal Manap (1975– ): MP for Aljunied GRC (2011– ) and member of the Workers' Party.
 Harun Abdul Ghani (1939–2005): MP for the now-defunct Hong Kah GRC (1991–2001).
 Othman Wok (1924–2017): first Minister for Social Affairs (1963–1977) and MP for Pasir Panjang SMC (1963–1977); Ambassador to Indonesia (1977–1981), Presidential Council for Minority Rights (1981– ).
 Sha'ari Tadin (1931–2009): MP for Kampong Chai Chee SMC (1968–1976) and Bedok SMC (1976–1980); Senior Parliamentary Secretary to the Minister for Culture (1972–1976); principal of Telok Kurau Secondary School (1977).
 Prof Yaacob Ibrahim (1955– ): MP for Jalan Besar GRC (1997–2011) and Moulmein-Kallang GRC (2011– ); Mayor of Central Singapore District (2001); Minister-in-charge of Muslim Affairs (2003– ): Minister for Community Development and Sports (2003–2004), Minister for Environment (2004–2006), Minister for Environment and Water Resources (2006–2011), Minister for Information, Communications and the Arts (2011–2012), Minister for Communications and Information (2012–2018).
 Yusof Ishak (1910–1970): journalist and co-founder of the Malay language newspaper Utusan Melayu; Yang di-Pertuan Negara (head of state, 1963–1965 and 1965–1970); first President of Singapore (1959–1970).

Religion
 Sanusi Mahmood (1909–1995): first Mufti of Singapore.

Sports
 Abdul Halim bin Haron (1972– ): bodybuilder; winner of a silver medal at the Asian Championship in 2001 and a gold medal in the Busan 2002 Asian Games (bantamweight category); inducted into the Singapore Sports Council's Hall of Fame.
 Aqilah Binte Sudhir (1991– ): shooter; winner of a gold medal in the Commonwealth Youth Games 2008 (Girls' 10m air rifle event ), a bronze medal in the SEA Games 2009 (individual category of the Women 50m Rifle 3-Position), and a bronze and gold medal in the Commonwealth Games 2010 (individual and pairs category of the Women's 50m rifle 3-position).
 Azman bin Abdullah (1963– ): bodybuilder; five-time Mr Singapore title holder, three-time Mr Asia and an Asian Pro-Am Classic Champion; three-time winner of the SEA Games gold medal; first Singaporean to win a gold medal in the middleweight division of the IOC-sanctioned World Games Bodybuilding Championship (1993).
 Fandi Ahmad (1962– ): soccer player; Singapore National Team member (1979–1997); competed in three SEA Games; Public Service Medal; included in Madame Tussauds Singapore.
 Indra Sahdan Daud (1979– ): soccer player; captain of the Singapore National Team; plays for Geylang International.
 Ismail Marjan (1920–1991): badminton men's doubles player; winner at the International Badminton Championships in Glasgow (1952); winner of the Thomas Cup and All England Championship (1949–1955).
 Kamsari Salam (1941– ): cyclist; winner of the silver medal at the 1965 SEAP Games and bronze medal at the 1967 SEAP Games.
 Lon bin Mohamed Noor (1921–unknown): weightlifter; National Champion (1947–1956); winner of the bronze medal at the 1951 Asian Games; first Malay athlete from Singapore to participate in the Olympic Games where he finished 8th place out of 19 at the 1952 Olympic Games in Helsinki (bantamweight category).
 Mardan Mamat (1964– ): golfer; first Singaporean to win a European Tour event by winning the 2006 OSIM Singapore Masters Tournament.
 Noor Azhar Hamid (1949– ): high jumper; represented Singapore in nine consecutive SEAP/SEA Games (1967–1981) and won three gold medals (1969, 1973 and 1975), a silver and two bronze medals.
 Zainal Abidin Abdul Malek (1952– ): squash player; won Singapore's national title five times (1977–1986), East Asia title six times, and the Japan Open title for two consecutive years (1985 and 1986); won the Penang Open title by beating world champion Ross Norman of New Zealand in the finals (1989).

References

Sources
 

 
Malay